Robert Fabbri (born January 22, 1996) is a Canadian professional ice hockey player for the Detroit Red Wings of the National Hockey League (NHL). He was drafted by the St. Louis Blues in the first round, 21st overall, of the 2014 NHL Entry Draft.

Growing up in Mississauga, Fabbri played youth hockey for the Minor Atom Mississauga Senators and Mississauga Rebels before being drafted sixth overall by the Guelph Storm during the 2012 Ontario Hockey League (OHL) draft. During his tenure with the team, he earned the Wayne Gretzky 99 Award as playoff MVP before beginning his professional career with the St. Louis Blues. Fabbri joined the Blues during their 2015–16 season, setting a franchise record as the youngest player to score a goal for the team and second youngest Blues player to record a hat trick.  He later won the Stanley Cup as a member of the Blues in 2019 before being traded to the Detroit Red Wings.

Early life
Fabbri was born on January 22, 1996, in Mississauga, Ontario, to parents Len and Stef Fabbri. He is of Italian descent from his grandparents. Fabbri considers his older brother Lenny "the most influential person in his hockey career." Growing up, he attended Our Lady of Mercy Elementary School and St. Aloysius Gonzaga Secondary School.

Playing career

Youth 

As a child growing up in Mississauga, Fabbri began playing ice hockey as a result of his older brother Lenny. He soon surpassed his older brother when he was enrolled in youth hockey programs and began playing with the year above his in the Minor Atom Mississauga Senators. He began his junior ice hockey career with the Mississauga Rebels in the Greater Toronto Hockey League (GTHL) before being drafted by the Guelph Storm in the first round, sixth overall, of the 2012 Ontario Hockey League (OHL) Priority Selection. When reflecting on their selections, Guelph's general manager Mike Kelly stated that Fabbri "has a high, high, high compete level. He’s cut from the same cloth as Hunter Garlent, only he’s a little bit bigger."

In his first year with the Guelph Storm, Fabbri recorded 33 points in 59 games. He recorded his first career major junior goal on September 6, 2012, in a 6–2 win over the Mississauga Steelheads. By November, Fabbri collected 11 points in 18 games and recorded his first career hat-trick during a 9–4 loss to the Niagara IceDogs. A few days later, Fabbri and prospect Matthew Mancina were selected to compete for Canada Ontario at the 2013 World U-17 Hockey Challenge. Upon returning from the tournament empty handed, Fabbri was selected to replace Rebels' first line during a 6–3 win over the Windsor Spitfires, where he recorded one assist. After the Storm lost in the OHL playoffs, Fabbri was named the team's Rookie of the Year.

As a result of his successful rookie campaign, Fabbri was invited to compete with the Canadian National U18 team at the 2013 Ivan Hlinka Memorial Tournament. He returned to the Storm for his sophomore season with a gold medal from the tournament. Leading up to the 2014 NHL Entry Draft, Fabbri was ranked 21st for North American skaters in the NHL Central Scouting Bureau's final rankings. On November 9, 2013, Fabbri was suspended for 10 games as a result of a check to the head during a game against the Kitchener Rangers. Returning from his suspension, Fabbri was chosen to compete at the 2014 CHL/NHL Top Prospects Game. Fabbri and the Storm qualified for the 2014 OHL playoffs where they competed against the Plymouth Whalers in the first round. During the second period of Game 1, Fabbri was hit from behind by Whalers defenceman Yannick Rathgeb, resulting in a 10-game suspension. The Storm beat the Whalers and Fabbri went on to record 28 points in 16 games to help the team win their third J. Ross Robertson Cup in franchise history. After concluding the season with a career-high 87 points in 58 games, Fabbri was selected in the first round, 21st overall, by the St. Louis Blues. Prior to his selection, he stated that he'd enjoy studying business at the University of Guelph after graduating from Our Lady of Lourdes Catholic School.

On September 3, 2014, Fabbri signed a three-year, two way entry-level contract with the Blues but returned to the Storm for his final year of major junior hockey. He was invited to participate in the 2015 World Junior Ice Hockey Championships where he suffered an ankle injury during the quarter-finals against Denmark and was held to only 30 games for the OHL season. Fabbri returned to the lineup after missing two months in a 5–2 loss to the Sarnia Sting on March 9, 2015. He would bounce back a few games later with a five-point night against the Windsor Spitfires in a 9–3 win. The Storm qualified for the 2015 OHL playoffs where they were eventually eliminated in the Western Conference Semi-finals by the Sault Ste. Marie Greyhounds. At the time, Fabbri was named the 10th best forward in Guelph Storm's history with 171 points in 147 regular season games.

Professional

St. Louis Blues 
At the conclusion of the 2014–15 season with the Storm, Fabbri was reassigned by the Blues to their American Hockey League (AHL) affiliate, the Chicago Wolves, on April 15, 2015. He was expected to replace injured Ty Rattie on a line with Jeremy Welsh and Adam Cracknell. He made his AHL debut on April 17 against the Rockford IceHogs, where he also became the first player in franchise history to record two points in his debut. A few days later, he made his postseason debut with the team as they entered Game 1 against the Utica Comets for the 2015 Calder Cup playoffs.

Following his season with the Wolves, Fabbri made the Blues' opening night roster for the 2015–16 season. He made his NHL debut on October 8, 2015, against the Edmonton Oilers at 19 years, 259 days, becoming the youngest player in franchise history to score his first NHL goal. By December, he had recorded nine goals, securing him a spot in seventh place amongst rookie goalscorers. Blues' Head Coach Ken Hitchcock praised Fabbri's goalscoring ability by saying "If you look at his goals, there’s maybe one that the goalie could have saved. All the rest just flat beat (the goalie). That’s pretty impressive. Now he’s up to the pace of the game and he’s going to be a threat all the time." His scoring improved and by February 14, 2016, he was tied for third amongst rookie scorers and became the first Blues player to participate in a fight since April 5, 2011. He continued to set records throughout his rookie season and soon became the first Blues rookie since Patrik Berglund in 2008–09 to reach the 15-goal mark. Shortly after reaching the 15-goal mark, Fabbri suffered a lower body injury as a result of a cross-check from Colorado Avalanche forward Jack Skille and was listed as Day-to-Day. He ended up missing four games before returning to the lineup for the Blues' last game of the regular season against the Washington Capitals. The Blues qualified for the 2016 Stanley Cup playoffs and Fabbri helped the team beat the Chicago Blackhawks during the Western Conference First Round. In seven games he had recorded five points and was fourth on the team in scoring.

The following season, Fabbri was once again named to the Blues' opening night roster for the 2016–17 season. After going seven games without a goal, Fabbri scored his first career NHL hat-trick on December 28, 2016, in a 6–3 win over the Philadelphia Flyers. He subsequently became the second youngest Blues player to record a hat trick, just behind Bernie Federko who achieved the feat at 20 years, 269 days. In spite of his early success, his season was cut short after he incurred an injury during a game against the Pittsburgh Penguins on February 4, 2017. Midway through the first period, he suffered a torn ACL in his left knee and was out for the remainder of the regular season and 2017 Stanley Cup playoffs. At the time of his injury, he had scored 11 goals and 18 assists for 29 points in 51 games played. Fabbri underwent surgery in Chicago on February 28, 2016, and was medically cleared to play on July 31. He returned to the Blues' roster for their training camp leading up to the 2017–18 season, but re-injured his left knee and was out for the remainder of the season.

Following a second surgery and being medically cleared to play, Fabbri signed a one-year, $925,000 contract with the St. Louis Blues for the 2018–19 season. He attended the BioSteel Hockey camp in August where Dallas Stars forward Tyler Seguin called him a "very determined guy" and said, "I know he’s a good teammate for the guys in St. Louis, and I wouldn’t be surprised if he had a heck of a year." Fabbri also attended the Blues' training camp where Head Coach Mike Yeo said he "looked good...He's skating, he's shooting, he's doing the things you hoped he could do and is showing his skill level… We've got a lot of belief in Robby and in his capabilities." In spite of this, he was reassigned to their AHL affiliate the San Antonio Rampage on a conditioning assignment, with the expectation he would rejoin the Blues eventually. Fabbri made his return to the Blues lineup on November 1, 2018, recording an assist in a 5–3 win over the Vegas Golden Knights. A few days later, he scored his first goal since December 28, 2016, en route to a 4–1 win over the Carolina Hurricanes. In spite of his hot start, by January 2019, the Blues were in last place around the entire league, which resulted in a coaching and goaltender change. Following the coaching change, the Blues qualified for the 2019 Stanley Cup playoffs. Fabbri recorded one goal in ten postseason games to help the Blues defeat the Boston Bruins to win the 2019 Stanley Cup. On July 12, 2019, following their Stanley Cup win, Fabbri signed a one-year, $900,000 contract to stay with the Blues before spending his day with the Cup in his hometown of Mississauga.

Fabbri re-joined the team for their 2019–20 season and played nine games for them before being traded to the Detroit Red Wings in exchange for Jacob de la Rose on November 6, 2019.

Detroit Red Wings 
Fabbri made his debut for the Red Wings on November 8, in a game against the Boston Bruins. He scored two power play goals in the 4–2 win, becoming the seventh player in franchise history to do so in their first game with the team. Following a 4–1 loss to the Toronto Maple Leafs on December 21, 2019, Fabbri was fined $2,419.35 for spearing Alexander Kerfoot. After enduring a seven-game scoring drought, Fabbri recorded his 12th goal of the season to tie for third on the team in goals during a 4–2 loss to the New York Rangers on January 30, 2020. His scoring slowed down during the month of February due to two injuries. He first suffered a lower-body injury during a game against the Boston Bruins on February 9, and was then reinjured after colliding with New Jersey Devils forward Jack Hughes. At the conclusion of the regular season, a few games early due to the coronavirus pandemic, Fabbri recorded 31 points in 52 games for the team.

On August 24, 2020, Fabbri signed a two-year, $5.9 million contract extension with the Red Wings. During his first season with the team, Fabbri was limited to 30 games but recorded 10 goals and eight assists. His eight game winning goals led the Red Wings and he was in a three-way tie for best plus-minus rating. On December 13, 2021, Fabbri signed a three-year, $12 million contract extension with the Red Wings.

Personal life
Fabbri became engaged to his girlfriend in June 2020.

Career statistics

Regular season and playoffs

International

Awards and honours

References

External links
 

1996 births
Living people
Canadian ice hockey centres
Canadian people of Italian descent
Chicago Wolves players
Detroit Red Wings players
Guelph Storm players
Ice hockey people from Ontario
Sportspeople from Mississauga
National Hockey League first-round draft picks
St. Louis Blues draft picks
St. Louis Blues players
San Antonio Rampage players
Stanley Cup champions